Six women's teams competed in basketball at the 1984 Summer Olympics.

The following players represented Australia:

 Bronwyn Marshall
 Donna Quinn-Brown
 Jenny Cheesman
 Julie Nykiel
 Karen Dalton
 Kathy Foster
 Marina Moffa
 Trish Cockrem
 Pat Mickan
 Robyn Maher
 Sue Geh
 Wendy Laidlaw

The following players represented Canada:

 Alison Lang
 Andrea Blackwell
 Anna Pendergast
 Bev Smith
 Candi Clarkson-Lohr
 Carol Sealey
 Debbie Huband
 Lynn Polson
 Misty Thomas
 Sylvia Sweeney
 Toni Kordic
 Tracie McAra

The following players represented China:

 Chen Yuefang
 Li Xiaoqin
 Ba Yan
 Song Xiaobo
 Qiu Chen
 Wang Jun
 Xiu Lijuan
 Zheng Haixia
 Cong Xuedi
 Zhang Hui
 Liu Qing
 Zhang Yueqin

The following players represented South Korea:

 Choi Ae-yeong
 Kim Eun-suk
 Lee Hyeong-suk
 Choi Gyeong-hui
 Lee Mi-ja
 Moon Gyeong-ja
 Kim Hwa-sun
 Jeong Myeong-hui
 Kim Yeong-hui
 Seong Jeong-a
 Park Chan-suk

The following players represented the United States:

 Teresa Edwards
 Lea Henry
 Lynette Woodard
 Anne Donovan
 Cathy Boswell
 Cheryl Miller
 Janice Lawrence
 Cindy Noble
 Kim Mulkey
 Denise Curry
 Pamela McGee
 Carol Menken-Schaudt

The following players represented Yugoslavia:

 Biljana Majstorović
 Cvetana Dekleva
 Jasmina Perazić
 Jelica Komnenović
 Marija Uzelac
 Polona Dornik
 Sanja Ožegović
 Slađana Golić
 Slavica Pečikoza
 Slavica Šuka
 Stojna Vangelovska
 Zagorka Počeković

References

1984